Dilpashar is a union parishad under Bhangura Upazila of Pabna District in the Rajshahi Division of western Bangladesh.

About
Dilpashar union comprises eight villages. They are Chachkia, Kajitol, Betuan,  Dilpashar, Magura, Adabariya, Patul, Laxmikol. There is a post office, health center, two secondary schools (B.B. High School & College and Chachkia Govt. Primary School), as well as two bazaars (Betuan and Dilpashar). Renowned Personalities: Abdur Rob Sardar (Ex Chairman), Aminul Islam Khan, Nobo Kumar Gosh, Safiur Rahman, Momtaz, Saiful Islam, Abu Bakkar Khan, Asokh Kumar Prono.

References

Unions of Bhangura Upazila